Wilhelm Kube (13 November 1887 – 22 September 1943) was a Nazi official and German politician. He was an important figure in the German Christian movement during the early years of Nazi rule. During the war he became a senior official in the occupying government of the Soviet Union, achieving the rank of Generalkommissar for Generalbezirk Weißruthenien. He was assassinated in Minsk in 1943 after participation in the Holocaust, triggering brutal reprisals against the citizens of Minsk.

An extreme antisemite and participant in numerous war crimes against Jewish people, he is known to have said about Jews: "What plague and syphilis are to humanity, are Jews to the white race." However, Kube behaved towards German Jews in a relatively mild way during his charge in Minsk, by trying—generally unsuccessfully—to protect German Jews, whom he felt as culturally closer, from extermination. As for Minsk, he planned to level the city and replace it with a German settlement, called Asgard.

Early life
Kube was born in Glogau (today's Głogów), Prussian Silesia, and studied history, economics and theology. In 1911 he received a Moses Mendelssohn Scholarship from the University of Berlin. Kube was active in the Völkisch movement as a student, and joined the Nazi Party in late 1927. From 1928 he was also leader of the tiny Nazi party faction (6 seats) in the Prussian Landtag (Prussian state legislature). Under his leadership it grew to be the largest party in the Landtag by 1932. On 1 February 1928, he was appointed Gauleiter of Ostmark with his seat at Frankfurt an der Oder. On 1 June 1933 this was merged with the neighboring Gau Brandenburg to form Gau Kurmark (later reorganized as the Gau March of Brandenburg) with its seat in Berlin. After the Nazis came to power, he was made Oberpräsident of the Prussian provinces of Brandenburg and Posen-West Prussia, thus uniting under his control the highest party and governmental offices in the provinces. He joined the SS on 29 September 1933 with the rank of Oberführer and on 27 January 1934, he was promoted to SS-Gruppenführer. In November 1933 he was elected as a Nazi deputy to the Reichstag from electoral constituency 5, Frankfurt/Oder. On 9 September 1935, Kube was made a member of the Academy for German Law.

Nazification of Christianity
Kube remained an active Christian as well as a zealous Nazi, and in 1932 he organised the list of candidates of the Faith Movement of the German Christians for the ordinary election of presbyters and synodals within the Evangelical Church of the old-Prussian Union on 13 November that year. The German Christians then gained about a third of all seats in presbyteries and synods. Kube was elected as one of the presbyters of the congregation of Gethsemane Church in Berlin-Prenzlauer Berg. The presbyters elected him from their midst as synodal into the competent deanery synod (Berlin then comprised 11 deaneries altogether), and these synodals again elected him a member of deanery synodal board. When in 1933 the Nazis came to power he remained active in the German Christian movement which sought to "Nazify" the 28 Protestant church bodies in Germany. For 23 July 1933 Hitler ordered an unconstitutional, premature re-election of all presbyters and synodals, with the German Christians now gaining 70–80% of the seats, so Kube could then further advance as head of the Berlin synod of the old-Prussian Church. Following the German conquest of Poland in 1939 his Nazi party domain was extended to include Reichsgau Danzig-West Prussia and Reichsgau Wartheland.

Accusations and removal from office
In late 1935 the Supreme Party Court under Chairman Walter Buch, the father-in-law of Martin Bormann, began an investigation into Kube due to allegations of adultery and corruption in running his Gau, including nepotism, favoritism and a dictatorial management style. In December he was issued a letter of reprimand. Swearing revenge, Kube sent an anonymous letter claiming that Buch was married to a "half-Jew". This, of course, would have far-reaching implications not only for Buch but for Bormann, whose wife consequently also was accused of not being a pure Aryan. Kube was leveling serious charges at two Party Reichsleiters. In the course of a Gestapo investigation, it came to light that the letter had been written by Kube. Buch and Bormann saw to it that Kube was removed from all his posts on 7 August 1936. Only on Hitler's orders was he allowed to retain the title of Gauleiter, albeit without a Gau.  Furthermore, owing to a dispute with Reinhard Heydrich over a search conducted of Kube's mistress' apartment, Kube offered his resignation from the SS on 11 March 1936; he was officially discharged on 1 April.

Generalkommissar of Weissruthenien
On 17 July 1941, in the wake of the German occupation of the western parts of the Soviet Union, he was appointed Generalkommissar for Weissruthenien (now known as Belarus), with his headquarters in Minsk. In this role Kube oversaw the extermination of the large Jewish population of this area. He was nevertheless outraged by the Slutsk Affair in October 1941, when SS Einsatzgruppen (death squads) massacred Jews without the authority of the local Nazi civil administration and Security SS authorities. Local non-Jewish Belarusians were also killed, creating great resentment among the population. Kube wrote in protest to his supervisor and Reichsführer-SS Heinrich Himmler:

The town was a picture of horror during the action. With indescribable brutality on the part of both the German police officers and particularly the Lithuanian partisans, the Jewish people, but also among them Belarusians, were taken out of their dwellings and herded together. Everywhere in the town shots were to be heard and in different streets the corpses of shot Jews accumulated. The Belarusians were in greatest distress to free themselves from the encirclement.

The letter concluded:

I am submitting this report in duplicate so that one copy may be forwarded to the Reich Minister. Peace and order cannot be maintained in Belarus with methods of that sort. To bury seriously wounded people alive who worked their way out of their graves again is such a base and filthy act that the incidents as such should be reported to the Führer and Reichsmarschall.

Despite these misgivings, Kube participated in an atrocity on 2 March 1942 in the Minsk ghetto. During a search by German and Belarusian police, a group of children were seized and thrown into pits of deep sand to die.

At that moment, several SS officers, among them Wilhelm Kube, arrived, whereupon Kube, immaculate in his uniform, threw handfuls of sweets to the shrieking children.  All the children perished in the sand.

Kube's contradictory attitude towards Jews is shown in his behaviour towards German Jews deported to Minsk. He was particularly incensed by the presence of deportees who had been decorated for their service in World War I. In at least one instance, he was able to arrange for the transfer of a decorated World War I veteran to Theresienstadt; the man, Karl Loewenstein (de:Karl Loewenstein), survived the war there.

His interest in these Jews, whom he regarded as belonging "to our cultural milieu," prompted him to file a complaint with Reinhard Heydrich, in which he stated that "during the evacuation of Jews from the Reich, the guidelines on who was to be evacuated had not been properly observed" and he attached a list of names. During the 2 March 1942 massacre, Generalkommissar Kube withheld German Jews from a mass shooting which was conducted in Minsk under the supervision of Sturmbannführer Eduard Strauch, at which 3,412 Jews were killed, an unprecedented act that provoked a formal complaint from the SS according to which "Generalkommissar Kube appears to have promised to the German Jews, who before my time were delivered to the ghetto five thousand strong, that life and health would remain theirs".

Heydrich flew to Minsk to deliver Kube a reprimand, after which he felt compelled to comply with extermination actions. On 31 July he wrote to his friend, the Reichskommissar for the Ostland, Hinrich Lohse, in Riga:

Following lengthy talks with the SS-Brigadeführer Zenner and the extraordinarily diligent head of the SD, SS-Obersturmbannführer Strauch, in the last two weeks in White Russia we have liquidated roughly 55,000 Jews....In the city of Minsk about 10,000 Jews were liquidated on 28 and 29 July. Of these, 6,500 were Russian Jews, predominantly women, children, and the aged; the rest were Jews unfit for labor, mainly from Vienna, Brünn, Bremen, and Berlin. The latter had been sent to Minsk last year in accordance with the Führer's orders....In Minsk proper there are 2,600 Jews from Germany left.

Assassination
At 1:20 am on 22 September 1943, Kube was assassinated in his Minsk apartment by a time device hidden in his mattress. The bomb was placed by Soviet partisan Yelena Mazanik (1914–1996), a Belarusian woman who was hired in Kube's household as a maid and was convinced to assassinate him later. According to alternate version, the explosives were set up by Lev Liberman from the Minsk ghetto, who was also employed in the household, but this later proved to be false. In total 12 groups received an order from Moscow to assassinate Kube.

The bomb went off forty minutes early, purportedly due to higher air temperature than that during bomb testing. In retaliation, the SS killed more than 1,000 men who were citizens of Minsk. Owing to Kube's antagonistic attitude to some SS anti-Jewish actions, Himmler felt that the dead man had been well on the way to booking himself a place in a concentration camp anyway, and reportedly described the assassination as a "blessing".

Mazanik escaped the reprisals and continued to fight with the partisans. On 29 October 1943 she was awarded the title Hero of the Soviet Union, along with other members of the assassination group Nadezhda Troyan and Maria Osipova. After the war she went on to become deputy director of the Fundamental Library of the Belarusian Academy of Sciences.

References

External links
 
 

1887 births
1943 deaths
Antisemitism in Germany
Christian fascists
Dachau concentration camp personnel
Deaths by improvised explosive device
Gauleiters
German nationalists
German National People's Party politicians
German Protestants
German Völkisch Freedom Party politicians
Holocaust perpetrators in Belarus
Members of the Academy for German Law
Members of the Reichstag of the Weimar Republic
Members of the Reichstag of Nazi Germany
National Socialist Freedom Movement politicians
Nazi leaders assassinated by the Allies
Nazi Party officials
Nazi Party politicians
People from Głogów
People from the Province of Silesia
Recipients of the Knights Cross of the War Merit Cross
People of Reichskommissariat Ostland
SS personnel